The Bangladesh A cricket team toured Sri Lanka to play 2 Unofficial Tests and 3 Unofficial ODIs against Sri Lanka A cricket team in September and October 2019.

Squads

First class series

1st Unofficial Test

2nd Unofficial Test

List A series

1st Unofficial ODI

2nd Unofficial ODI

3rd Unofficial ODI

References

External links
 Series home at ESPN Cricinfo

A team cricket
2019 in Sri Lankan cricket
2019 in Bangladeshi cricket